Mohammad Reza Zadmehr (born August 16, 1956 in Tehran, Iran) is a retired Iranian football player. He played all of his football career at Persepolis and was the club's team manager from 2012 to 2013. He is currently a board member of Persepolis.

Honors
Persepolis
Iranian Football League (and Tehran Provincial League):
Winners (6): 1975–76, 1982–83, 1986–87, 1987–88, 1988–89, 1989–90
Hazfi Cup:
Winners (4): 1981–82, 1984–85, 1986–87, 1987–88
Tehran Super Cup:
Winners (1): 1992

References

1956 births
Living people
People from Tehran
Iranian footballers
Persepolis F.C. players
Association footballers not categorized by position